"Pathway to the Moon" is a song by British R&B group MN8. It was released in February 1996 as the fifth single from their debut album, To the Next Level. It peaked at number 25 on the UK Singles Chart. The single also includes the tracks Someone To Love and 4 Ya Flava.

Track listings
 12"
 "Pathway to the Moon"
 "Baby It's You" (OJI West Coast Mix) 
 "Happy" (Jodeci Mix)
 "Someone to Love" — 3:52

 CD single
 "Pathway to the Moon" — 3:44
 "Someone to Love" — 3:52
 "Baby It's You" (OJI West Coast Mix) — 4:15
 '4 Ya Flava' — 4:44

 Cassette single
 "Pathway to the Moon" — 3:44
 "Someone to Love" — 3:52

Charts

References

1996 singles
MN8 songs
1995 songs
Columbia Records singles